The Chiba Six Man Tag Team Championship is a professional wrestling world tag team championship promoted by the Japanese promotion Active Advance Pro Wrestling. It was previously known as promoted by Kaientai Dojo, promotion which changed its name to 2AW Pro Wrestling, owned by Taka Michinoku until 2019. The championship is contested for by teams of three wrestlers and like most professional wrestling championships, the title is won as a result of a match with a predetermined outcome. There have been eighteen reigns, shared among fifteen teams with 33 different champions and two vacancies. The current champions are Ayumu Honda, Kyu Mogami and Taishi Takizawa who are in their first reign as a tag team.

Title history

Combined reigns 

{| class="wikitable sortable" style="text-align: center"
!Rank
!Team
!No. ofreigns
!Combineddefenses
!Combineddays
|-
!1
|style="background-color:#FFE6BD"|Ayumu Honda, Kyu Mogami and Taishi Takizawa † || 1 || 0 || +
|-
!2
| Ayumu Honda, Kyu Mogami and Yuki Sato || 1 || 3 || 148
|-
!3
| Little Galaxy || 1 || 2 || 140
|-
!4
| Ayato Yoshida, Tank Nagai and Tatsuya Hanami || 1 || 4 || 130
|-
!5
| Dinosaur Takuma, Kotaro Yoshino and Yuma || 1 || 2 || 98
|-
!6
| Silence || 1 || 3 || 97
|-
!7
| Bambi, Ricky Fuji and Yuji Hino || 1 || 3 || 92
|-
!8
| Rasse, Yapper Man I and Yapper Man II || 3 || 2 || 74
|-
!9
| Isami Kodaka, Kengo Mashimo and Taka Michinoku || 1 || 0 || 63
|-
!10
| Ayato Yoshida, Kotaro Yoshino and Tank Nagai || 1 || 1 || 61
|-
!11
| Chojin Yusha G Valion, Dinosaur Takuma and Kotaro Yoshino || 1 || 0 || 48
|-
!12
| Ayumu Honda, Kunio Toshima and Kyu Mogami || 1 || 0 || 40
|-
!13
| Chango, Dinosaur Takuma and Kaji Tomato || 1 || 0 || 30
|-
!14
| Muno Taiyo || 2 || 0 || 7
|-
!15
| Satoshi, Shoichi Uchida and Tadanobu Fujisawa || 1 ||0 ||style="background-color:#bbeeff| ¤N/A

By wrestler 
{|class="wikitable sortable" style="text-align: center"
!Rank
!Wrestler
!data-sort-type="number"|No. ofreigns
!data-sort-type="number"|Combineddefenses
!data-sort-type="number"|Combineddays	
|-
!rowspan=2|1
|style="background-color:#FFE6BD"| Ayumu Honda † || 3 || 3 || +
|-
|style="background-color:#FFE6BD"| Kyu Mogami † || 3 || 3 || +
|-
!3
| style="background-color:#FFE6BD"|Taishi Takizawa † || 1 || 0 || +
|-
!4
| Yuki Sato || 2 || 5 || 288
|-
!rowspan=2|5
| Ayato Yoshida || 2 || 5 || 191
|-
| Tank Nagai || 2 || 5 || 191
|-
!7
| Dinosaur Takuma || 3 || 2 || 176
|-
!rowspan=2|8
| Hiro Tonai || 1 || 2 || 140
|-
|Shiori Asahi || 1 || 2 || 140
|-
!10
| Tatsuya Hanami || 1 || 4 || 130
|-
!11
| Kaji Tomato || 2 || 3 || 127
|-
!12
| Kotaro Yoshino || 2 || 3 || 109
|-
!13
| Yuma || 1 || 2 || 98
|-
!14
| Marines Mask || 1 || 3 || 97
|-
!rowspan=3|15
| Bambi || 1 || 3 || 92
|-
| Ricky Fuji || 1 || 3 || 92
|-
| Yuji Hino || 1 || 3 || 92
|-
!rowspan=3|18
| Rasse || 3 || 2 || 74
|-
| Yapper Man I || 3 || 2 || 74
|-
| Yapper Man II || 3 || 2 || 74
|-
!rowspan=3|21
| Isami Kodaka || 1 || 0 || 63
|-
| Kengo Mashimo || 1 || 0 || 63
|-
| Taka Michinoku || 1 || 0 || 63
|-
!24 
| Chojin Yusha G Valion || 1 || 0 || 48
|-
!25
| Kunio Toshima || 1 || 0 || 40
|-
!26
| Chango || 1 || 0 || 30
|-
!rowspan=3|27
| Brahman Kei || 2 || 0 || 7
|-
| Brahman Shu || 2 || 0 || 7
|-
| The Great Sasuke || 2 || 0 ||  7
|-
!rowspan=3|30
| Satoshi || 1 || 0 || style="background-color:#bbeeff| ¤N/A
|-
| Shoichi Uchida || 1 || 0 || style="background-color:#bbeeff| ¤N/A
|-
| Tadanobu Fujisawa || 1 || 0 || style="background-color:#bbeeff| ¤N/A

References

External links
 Chiba Six Man Tag Team Championship

Active Advance Pro Wrestling championships
Trios wrestling tag team championships